= Community Brit Braja =

Jewish community in Mexico

Total population
- Approx. 200

Founder
- Jacques Cukierkorn

Regions with significant populations
- Mexico

Religions
- Reform Judaism

Languages
- Spanish, Hebrew, Portuguese

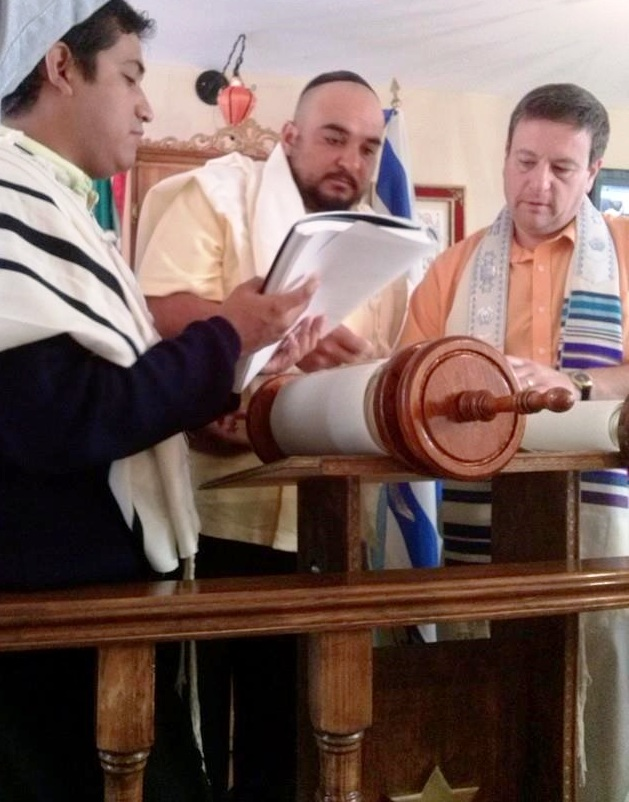
Shabbat service at community Brit Braja.

The Community Brit Braja of Mexico, better known as Brit Braja, is an emerging Jewish community, legally constituted as a civil association.

== Background ==
Community Brit Braja is composed mostly of Jewish converts with some historical Jews, although all members are considered as Jews, without any distinction; it is a non-denominational community (independent of other Jewish currents), but is governed by ethical and theological principles of reformist or progressive Judaism, so this community presents a liberal and progressive approach to Judaism, according to the times in which Judaism is lived.

It is a self-sustaining and autonomous non-profit institution created around the idea of openness and acceptance. It specializes in providing distance education for Jews in Latin America and Spain by providing coverage to Jews from diverse backgrounds who reside throughout the Mexican Republic, Latin America and other parts of the world (Spanish speaking), which they share A liberal thought.

It is the first reformist or progressive community in Mexico and the only one in Latin America that transmits its religious services uninterruptedly online and in real time, transmitted from the Brit Brajá Synagogue, as well as a Yeshivá online the Yeshivá Brit Brajá. It has a presence in several states of the Mexican republic.

Since its inception in 2008, it has created and translated a large number of materials from liberal Judaism into Spanish and through collaboration, it engages with Brit Braja Worldwide Jewish Outreach, based in the United States and other organizations, offers help, guidance and support for emerging liberal communities throughout Latin America and other parts of the world (including Portuguese and English speaking.).

The Brit Brajá Reform Community of Mexico, A.C. is a supportive link for Jewish life, creating a network of Jews with a liberal, human and reformist sense, to be a strong, united, open reformist community. maintains relations and is in communication with other Jewish communities and receives visitors from other communities from other currents of Judaism.

It is characterized because the majority of its members have a high academic degree or dedicate themselves to commerce, as it is an inclusive, tolerant community and without any discrimination due to origin, race, gender or socioeconomic and academic level, women can conduct services and hold any position in the synagogue; religious services are in Spanish and Hebrew; as well as the use of Information and Communication technologies (ICTs), such as the use of Sidur and other sacred texts in digital format for religious services; the use of musical instruments during religious services and other technologies.
